This is a list of the current and former aerial lift manufacturers. This list includes surface lift manufacturers.

Current 

Aarconinfra Ropeways & Future Mobility Pvt Ltd , India 
Anzen Sakudo – Japan
Axet – Sweden
Bartholet – Switzerland, manufactured ropeways from 1976
Gangloff – Switzerland, founded in 1928, acquired by Bartholet in 2014
BMHRI – China
Borer – Switzerland
Usha Breco Limited - India, founded in 1969 {http://ushabreco.com}
SunKid – Austria
CCM Finotello – Italy, manufactured ropeways from the 1990s
Carvatech – Austria
Damodar Ropeways & Infra Ltd (DRIL) – India
Doppelmayr Garaventa Group – Austria, merging of Doppelmayr and Garaventa in 2002
CWA Constructions – Switzerland, manufactured ropeway cabins from 1956, acquired by Doppelmayr in 2001
Liftbyggarna – Sweden, founded in 1952, acquired by Doppelmayr Garaventa Group in 2013
FOD – Serbia
Gimar Montaz Mautino – France, merging of Gimar and Montaz Mautino in 1989
Globe – Poland
Graffer – Italy
Him Cableways – India, founded in 1992
Inauen-Schätti – Switzerland
Hongji – China
HTI Group – Italy
Leitner Ropeways – Italy, founded in 1888
Agudio – Italy, founded in 1861
Poma – France, founded in 1936, acquired in 2000
Leitner-Poma – United States
Skytrac – United States, acquired by Leitner-Poma in 2016
Sigma Cabins – France, founded in 1961
Skirail – France, founded in 1981, acquired by Poma in 1987
MEB – Italy
MND Ropeways – France
M&M Ropeways – India
Nippon Cable – Japan, founded in 1953
REAC – Spain, founded in 1961
Rowema – Switzerland
SkyTrans – United States
Steurer – Austria, manufactured ropeways from 1926
STM Sistem Teleferik – Turkey, founded in 1998
Superior Tramway − United States, founded in 1981
Sztokfisz - Poland 
Tatralift – Slovakia, founded in 1975
Tosaku – Japan, founded in 1991
TTC – Switzerland
Vintertec – Finland
Von Rotz & Wiedemar – Switzerland
Umel Dalekovodmontaza d.o.o Tuzla -Bosnia and Herzegovina, since 1976, www.udm.ba

Former 

Abig – Germany
American Steel and Wire – United States
Applevage – France, manufactured ropeways between the 1930s and 1962
ATG – Germany
Australasian Ropeway – Australia, manufactured chairlifts between the 1960s and 1970s
Badoni – Italy
Bell – Switzerland, manufactured ropeways between 1877 and 1968
BM Lifts – Canada
Breco – United Kingdom
Cables & Monorail – France
CECIL – France
Ceretti & Tanfani – Italy
Constam – Switzerland, founded in 1929
Creissels (DCSA) – France
De Pretis – Austria
Drago – Italy
Duport – France
Funivie d'Italia – Italy
Giovanola – Switzerland, manufactured ropeways between 1949 and the 1970s
GMD Müller – Switzerland, founded in 1947, closed in 1985 
Hamilton – New Zealand
Heuss – Germany
Hopkins – United States, founded in 1962, ropeway division acquired by SkyTrans in 2001
Roebling – United States, manufactured ropeways from 1940, acquired by Hopkins in 1965
Imes – Italy
Krupp – Germany
LST Ropeway Systems – Germany
Marchisio – Italy, founded in 1951, acquired by CCM Finotello in 1993
McCallum – Australia, manufactured T-bars and chairlifts in the 1960s and 1970s
Mécalift – France, founded in 1976, closed in 1981
Transcâble – France
Miner-Denver – United States, founded in 1967, closed in 1970
Mostostal – Poland, manufactured T-bars and chairlifts
Murray-Latta – Canada
Nascivera – Italy
NSD Niederberger – Switzerland, founded in 1881, acquired by Inauen-Schätti in 2007
Odermatt – Switzerland
Pullman-Berry
Huntsinger Skilifts
PWH – Germany
Pohlig-Heckel-Bleichert (PHB) – Germany, merging of Pohlig, Heckel, and Bleichert
Riblet – United States, founded in 1908, closed in 2003
Ski Lift International – United States, founded in 1965, acquired by Riblet in 1973
Ringer – Germany, founded in 1950, closed in 1953
Sacif – Italy
Samson – Canada, manufactured ropeways between the 1960s and 1988
Sakgiproshakht – Soviet Georgia, founded in 1946, closed in 1990
Geospectrans – Georgia
Skima – Switzerland
Skyway – Canada, manufactured ropeways during the 1970s
Stemag – Austria
Streiff – Switzerland, acquired by Inauen-Schätti
Swoboda – Austria, ropeway division founded in 1956
Tbilisi Aircraft Manufacturing – Georgia
Teletrasporti – Italy
Tiegel – United States, founded in 1959, ceased manufacturing ropeways in 1968
Transporta Chrudim – Czechoslovakia
Transtélé – France, founded in the 1970s, closed in 1979
Trojer – Italy
Vöest Alpine – Austria
Weber – France
Wiesner – Czechoslovakia
Wito – Austria
Dolomitenwerk – Austria
Wopfner – Austria, founded in 1952, closed in 1996
Wullschleger – Switzerland
Yac – France, manufactured platter lifts
Yan Lift – United States, founded in 1965, closed in 1996
Zemella – Italy

Acquired by Doppelmayr Garaventa Group 
CTEC – United States, founded in 1978, merged with Garaventa in 1992
Partek – United States, founded in 1996, acquired by Doppelmayr CTEC in 2005
Borvig – United States, closed in 1993
Thiokol – United States, ropeway division founded in 1971 and closed in 1977
Girak – Austria, acquired by Garaventa in 1996
Hölzl – Italy, founded in 1945, acquired by Doppelmayr in 2002
Agamatic – Italy, founded in 1981, merged with Doppelmayr in 2002
Küpfer – Switzerland, founded in 1948, merged with Garaventa in 1985
Von Roll – Switzerland, ropeway division acquired by Doppelmayr in 1996
Bühler – Switzerland, founded in 1962, acquired by Von Roll in 1975
Habegger – Switzerland, manufactured ropeways from 1945, acquired by Von Roll in 1982
Brändle – Switzerland
Sameli-Huber – Switzerland
Oehler – Switzerland, ropeway division acquired by Habegger in the 1970s
Hall Ski-Lift – United States, founded in 1954, merged with Von Roll in 1982 
WSO Städeli – Switzerland, manufactured ropeways from 1957, acquired by Garaventa in 1991
Tebru – Switzerland, acquired by WSO Städeli

Acquired by HTI Group 
Baco – Switzerland, founded in 1950, acquired by Poma in 1981
Carlevaro & Savio – Italy, acquired by Agudio
Heron – United States, acquired by Poma
Montagner – France, founded in 1968, acquired by Poma in 1994
SACMI – France, founded in 1960, acquired by Poma
Waagner-Biro – Austria, ropeway division acquired by Leitner Ropeways in 1999

Notes

External links
 Chairlift.org list of brands

Aerial Lift